Acyrocera is a genus of flies in the family Stratiomyidae.

Distribution
New Guinea.

Species
Acyrocera argyraspis Lindner, 1937

References

Stratiomyidae
Brachycera genera
Taxa named by Erwin Lindner
Diptera of Australasia